Jack Mulcahy is an American actor known for being one of the leads in The Brothers McMullen.

Mulcahy started in the entertainment business as a lead vocalist and guitarist for various Rock 'n' roll bands around New York City. His first film role was in Porky's (1981), directed by Bob Clark. After the sequel, Porky's II: The Next Day (1983), Mulcahy appeared in several films and television shows including Law & Order; NYPD Blue; Creating Rem Lezar; Awakenings; and Cadillac Man. In 1995, he was cast as Jack, one of the three brothers in The Brothers McMullen. The film won the Grand Jury Prize at the Sundance Film Festival that year and was distributed by 20th Century Fox.

In 2006, he produced and starred in a play called PrimeTime, written by Alex DeWitt and directed by Fern Lopez. He later appeared in the Off-Broadway showcase of Friction. On film, Mulcahy has appeared in five lead roles, including Stuck In The Middle and Reunion 108.

In 2006, Mulcahy appeared in a Snickers commercial, playing guitar and singing.

Filmography

References

External links

 

Living people
American male actors
Stuyvesant High School alumni
American people of Irish descent
Year of birth missing (living people)